Instituto Nacional de Meteorologia (INMET) is the national meteorological organization of Brazil, responsible for weather forecasting, collecting climate data, and alerting the public of extreme weather. It is part of the Ministry of Agriculture, Livestock and Food Supply.

Employing 99 people and with an annual budget of about 16 million USD, it is a member of the World Meteorological Organization. Its director as of April 2021 is Miguel Ivan Lacerda de Oliveira.

INMET traces its origins to a 1909 decree by then president of Brazil Nilo Peçanha, establishing the Directoria de Meteorologia e Astronomia.

References

External links 
INMET homepage
ALERT-AS, Brazil's severe weather warning system

Scientific organisations based in Brazil
Governmental meteorological agencies in South America
Government agencies of Brazil